Stuck Here on Snakes Way is the third album from Omnium Gatherum released in 2007. It is the band's first release on Candlelight Records.

It is the first album to feature Jukka Pelkonen on vocals and Aapo Koivisto on keyboards.

Track listing
All lyrics written by Jukka Pelkonen.

Credits
Jukka Pelkonen: Vocals
Markus Vanhala: Guitar
Harri Pikka: Guitar
Janne Markkanen: Bass
Aapo Koivisto: Keyboards
Jarmo Pikka: Drums

References

Omnium Gatherum albums
2007 albums